Dactylifric acid (also known as dattelic acid or 5-O-caffeoylshikimic acid) is an ester derived from caffeic acid and shikimic acid. It and its isomers are enzymic browning substrates found in dates (Phoenix dactylifera fruits).

Some older sources identify dactylifric acid as 3-O-caffeoylshikimic acid.

References

External links 
 Dactylifric acid at the Human Metabolome Database

Hydroxycinnamic acid esters
Hydroxycinnamic acid glycosides
Cyclitol esters
Cyclohexenes
Vinylogous carboxylic acids